Herbert Loren Adams (April 14, 1928 – February 1, 2012) was an American outfielder who played three seasons  in Major League Baseball for the Chicago White Sox. He was born in Hollywood, California and later coached at Northern Illinois University.

References

1928 births
2012 deaths
Major League Baseball outfielders
Chicago White Sox players
Buffalo Bisons (minor league) players
Columbus Red Birds players
Hot Springs Bathers players
Houston Buffaloes players
Indianapolis Indians players
Los Angeles Angels (minor league) players
Madisonville Miners players
Memphis Chickasaws players
Mobile Bears players
Omaha Cardinals players
Springfield Cubs players
United States Army personnel of the Korean War
Baseball players from California
Northern Illinois Huskies baseball players
People from Hollywood, Los Angeles
Sportspeople from Tulsa, Oklahoma
Sportspeople from Wheaton, Illinois
United States Army soldiers